Indirect National Council elections were held in the Czech part of Czechoslovakia on 10 June 1968, the first time Czechs had elected their own legislature. Of the 200 members of the National Council, 150 were elected indirectly by the National Assembly, whilst the other 50 members were elected by the National Council itself on 21 November 1968.

Results

Notes

References

External links
Election on 10 June 1968 PSP
Czech national Council Meeting Proposal for by-election PSP
The first meeting of Czech Parliament PSP

Czech
Legislative elections in Czechoslovakia
Elections to the Chamber of Deputies of the Czech Republic
Indirect elections
Single-candidate elections